Konami is a Japanese video game developer and publisher.

Konami may also refer to:

 Konami Code, a video game cheat sequence often used by the developer
 Konami, a character in the anime Popotan
 Kunami, a fictional fruit in the Portuguese show Gato Fedorento that resembles rotten fruit
 Konami (wrestler), Japanese professional wrestler

See also 
 Komani (disambiguation)